France competed at the 1955 Mediterranean Games in Barcelona, Spain.

Medalists

By sport

Gold
Jacques Degats — Athletics, 400 metres
Alain Mimoun — Athletics, 5000 metres
Alain Mimoun — Athletics, 10,000 metres
Philippe Candau — Athletics, 110 metres hurdles
Guy Cury — Athletics, 400 metres hurdles
Jacques Degats, Pierre Haarhoff, René Galland, Jean-Paul Martin du Gard — Athletics, 4 x 400 metres relay
Maurice Fournier — Athletics, High jump
Éric Battista — Athletics, Triple jump
Raymond Thomas — Athletics, Shot put
Michel Macquet — Athletics, Javelin throw
Henri Butel — Rowing, Single sculls
Jacques Maillet, Raymond Salles — Rowing, Double sculls
?? — Rowing, Coxless pairs
Édouard Leguery, Claude Martin — Rowing, Coxed pairs
Alphonse Halimi — Boxing, –54 kg
Georges Henny — Boxing, –57 kg
Hippolyte Annex — Boxing, –63.5 kg
Gilbert Chapron — Boxing, –81 kg
Christian d'Oriola — Fencing, Individual foil
Roger Closset, René Coicaud, Christian d'Oriola, Adrien Rommel — Fencing, Team foil
Jacques Lefèvre — Individual sabre
Roger Closset, Daniel Dagallier, Armand Mouyal, René Queyroux — Fencing, Team épée
René Changeat — Gymnastics, Vault
Jean Debuf — Weightlifting, –90 kg
Roger Bielle — Wrestling, Freestyle –67 kg
Aldo Eminente — Swimming, Freestyle 100 metres
Jean Boiteux — Swimming, Freestyle 400 metres
Jean Boiteux — Swimming, Freestyle 1500 metres
Gilbert Bozon — Swimming, Backstroke 100 metres
Hugues Broussard — Swimming, Breaststroke 200 metres
Maurice Lusien — Swimming, Butterfly 200 metres
Jean Boiteux, Aldo Eminente, Alex Jany, Guy Montserret — Swimming, 4 × 200 m freestyle relay
Gilbert Bozon, Hugues Broussard, Aldo Eminente, Maurice Lusien — Swimming, 4 × 100 m medley relay 
Christian Pire — Diving, 3 metre springboard
??? — Rugby, Team
Jacques Esnault — Shooting, 50 metre small-bore rifle standing
Jacques Mazoyer — Shooting, 50 metre small-bore rifle kneeling
Jacques Mazoyer — Shooting, 50 metre small-bore rifle 3 positions
Jacques Mazoyer — Shooting, mobile silhouette rifle

Silver
Jacques Lefèvre, Jean Levavasseur, Marcel Parent, Jacques Roulot — Fencing, Team sabre

Bronze
Jean-Jacques Guissart, ??? — Rowing, Coxed fours
Pierre Blondiaux, Yves Delacour, René Guissart, René Lotti, ????? — Rowing, Eights
Pierre Court, Pierre Guerin, Claude Hauet, Jean Hauet, Diran Manoukian, Philippe Reynaud, Jean Zizine — Field hockey, Team

Athletics

Basketball

Football

Swimming

References

External links
Official report of the 1955 Mediterranean Games

Nations at the 1955 Mediterranean Games
1955
Mediterranean Games